Joseph B. McCormick is a physician, scientist, and educator from the United States.

Biography

Early life

Joseph B. McCormick was born in Knoxville, Tennessee, on October 16, 1942.  His early years were spent on a farm in Indiana.

Education
Florida Southern College. 1964 Graduated cum laude.  Majored in chemistry and mathematics.

Duke University School of Medicine. 1967 - 1971

Harvard School of Public Health. 1970 Masters of Science

Children's Hospital of Philadelphia. 1971 - 1973 Internship and residency in Pediatrics (under Dr. C. Everett Koop)

Centers for Disease Control and Prevention (CDC). 1975 - 1976 Fellow, Preventive Medicine Residency Program

Early career
Following graduation from college, he located in Brussels, Belgium and attended the Alliance Francaise and the Free University for a year.  He learned the French language to enable him to teach sciences and mathematics in a secondary school in Kinshasa, Congo. While living in the Congo, he worked in a local hospital and developed an interest in medicine and specifically tropical diseases.

Medical career
In 1974, following his residency training, he was appointed an Epidemic Intelligence Service Officer at the CDC.
In 1993, he was appointed Chairman of Community Health and Sciences at the Aga Khan University Medical School (AKU). He established an epidemiology program, similar to the CDC.
In 1997 he returned to France where he started epidemiology programs for the Institute Pasteur and for Aventis Pasteur, the world's largest vaccine manufacturer.
He became Assistant Dean, University of Texas Health Science Center School of Public Health, at Brownsville campus on January 1, 2001.

Milestones
McCormick studied patients with Lassa fever while in Africa.  After clinical testing, he found that prompt and aggressive treatment with ribavirin significantly improved patient survival.

Dr. McCormick has over 200 scientific publications with co-authors from over 20 different countries.  He has held several university positions and had over 30 consultancies with organizations such as the World Health Organization (WHO), Pan American Health Organization. He has acted as reviewer for many scientific journals.
Dr. McCormick was interviewed in 2006 for the television program Frontline "The Age of Aids" produced by the Public Broadcasting Service.

Volunteer work
1969 Summer Fellowship with the Institute of Nutrition of Central America and Panama, Guatemala.
1971 Summer Fellowship in Rural Health Clinics in Haiti

Academic appointments
Regional Dean, James H. Steele Professor of Epidemiology, U. of Texas Houston School of Public Health
Professor, Institut Pasteur, Paris, France
Professor and Chairman, Department of Community Health Sciences, Aga Khan University, Karachi, Pakistan
Visiting Scientist at Scripps Clinic and Research Foundation, La Jolla, California
Adjunct Professor at Emory University
Adjunct Professor at University of North Carolina
Member, Scientific Board, Centre Internationale de Recherche Medical (CIRMF), Paris, France
Membre du Groupe d'Etudes de Virologie de L’Institut Pasteur (1984 -1990)

Awards and honors
He is the recipient of humanitarian awards from Florida Southern College and Duke University Medical School.

Personal life
He is an accomplished amateur pianist, and enjoys outdoor activities such as running, cycling, back packing, skiing and fly-fishing.  Dr. McCormick is fluent in several languages.  He is married to a fellow epidemiologist Dr. Susan Fisher-Hoch.

Publications (books, articles)
Joseph B. McCormick is a co-author with Fisher-Hoch of the book Level 4: Virus Hunters of the CDC.,

See also
Lassa Fever

References

External links
https://web.archive.org/web/20150613021107/http://blue.utb.edu/sfisherhoch/coinstructors.htm Joseph B. McCormick, University of Texas Health Science Center
http://www.pbs.org/wgbh/pages/frontline/aids/interviews/mccormick.html PBS Interview with Dr. McCormick

Living people
American tropical physicians
Harvard School of Public Health alumni
Florida Southern College alumni
Duke University School of Medicine alumni
Academic staff of Aga Khan University
American expatriate academics
American expatriates in Pakistan
Year of birth missing (living people)